'47 is a privately held American clothing brand founded in 1947 by twin Italian immigrant brothers, Henry and Arthur D'Angelo. '47 maintains licenses to create headwear, apparel and accessories for the Major League Baseball, National Basketball Association, National Hockey League, National Football League, Big Bash League, Minor League Baseball, Major League Lacrosse, National Rugby League and over 900 college institutions in the United States.

In 2014, '47 became an official licensed on-field partner for four teams in the Cape Cod Baseball League. In 2015, '47 expanded their portfolio with a USSF and Major League Soccer partnership deal. In the same year, they clinched the rights to produce caps for MLB on-field postseason celebrations until 2019 and secured a license to create merchandise for Major Baseball League International (MLBI). In 2013, they reported an estimated $230 Million in revenue.

Rebranding 
In 2010, Twins Enterprise changed its name to '47 Brand. In 2015, they dropped the "brand" in "'47 Brand."

The company is still occasionally referred to as "'47 Brand" or "Twins Enterprise" in various publications.

Founders 
Arthur and Henry D'Angelo, identical twin brothers, were born in Orsogna, Italy in 1926. They came to the United States in 1938 at age twelve and soon began selling various items, including Boston Red Sox pennants on the streets near Fenway Park where the Boston Red Sox play. In 1977, Arthur's oldest son, Robert, joined the business. In the next nine years, Arthur's three other sons (Mark, David, Steven) joined as well. Henry D'Angelo died from cancer in 1987.

On September 21, 2013, the Red Sox and Mayor Thomas Menino honored Arthur D'Angelo by naming a street near Fenway Park after him, "Arthur's Way" and had him throw the first pitch. Arthur D'Angelo remains president of '47, with his four sons in leadership positions: Steven D'Angelo, Robert D'Angelo, David D'Angelo and Mark D'Angelo.

Locations 
In 1965, the D'Angelo brothers purchased a 2,000 sq.ft. retail space on Yawkey Way to sell Red Sox souvenirs. They now own and operate the official pro-shop at 19 Jersey Street across from Fenway Park: The Red Sox Team Store. On game days, the store operates within stadium confines and is open to ticketed patrons two hours before game time, throughout the game, and thirty minutes after the last pitch. The store opens at 9am daily. The company headquarters is located in Westwood, MA. In addition, they have a 200,000 sq.ft. warehouse in Brockton, MA.

Organizations 
In 2015, '47 created headwear, accessories and apparel for the Black Fives Foundation, a 501(c)3 organization that preserves the history of basketball pre-racial integration. This venture marked the first ever sports licensed retail deal with a not-for-profit organization.

References

External links 
 

Clothing brands of the United States
Companies based in Norfolk County, Massachusetts
Sportswear brands
Westwood, Massachusetts